The Disney Vacation Club (DVC) is a vacation timeshare program owned and operated by Disney Vacation Development, Inc., a subsidiary of Disney Signature Experiences, a division of Disney Parks, Experiences and Products, a segment of The Walt Disney Company. It allows buying a real estate interest in a DVC resort via a flexible points-based membership system. There are an estimated 220,000 club members.

History
The first Disney Vacation Club property, known as the Disney Vacation Club Resort (later renamed Disney's Old Key West Resort in January 1996), opened on December 20, 1991 at Walt Disney World. In 1991, Disney had registered its time share plan with the state of Hawaii but did not establish an escrow agreement with Hawaii at the time of its creation.  This allowed Disney to advertise its time share company in the state but did not allow for sales. On January 17, 1992, Disney Vacation Club was incorporated as Disney Vacation Development, Inc.

On March 30, 1993 Disney Vacation Development Inc announced plans for a 440-unit time-share resort 95 miles south-east of Walt Disney World in Florida with ground breaking on July 28, 1994. This resort hotel, today known as Disney's Vero Beach Resort, opened on October 1, 1995, as the Vacation Club Resort at Vero Beach, Florida. Disney would then open Disney's Hilton Head Island Resort just five months later on March 1, 1996 in Hilton Head Island, South Carolina.

Disney's Animal Kingdom Villas opened its first phase in 2007 at $17,000 for a membership. By September 17, 2008, Disney Vacation Development had two new time share properties being built, Bay Lake Tower and Treehouse Villas in Orlando at existing Disney park hotels and both were to open in 2009. Bay Tower was expect for its timeshares to open at $18,000.

On October 3, 2007, Disney announced it would open its latest Disney Vacation Club resort on 21 acres it had purchased in Ko Olina Resort, Honolulu/Oahu, with building slated to begin in 2008 with completion in 2011. The resort would offer both DVC units as well as standard hotel rooms for guests of the resort.  With the announcement, DVC filed its remaining paperwork to allow its timeshare units to be sold in Hawaii. Three top executives were fired for selling 460 Ko Olina timeshare units for what were deemed unprofitable prices. The Hawaii resort opened as Aulani on August 28, 2011.

In early 2011 it was reported that Disney had purchased land near National Harbor, Maryland, a suburb of Washington, D.C., to potentially build a resort similar to the three Disney Vacation Club resorts not located at Walt Disney World. In late November 2011, however, Disney announced that it had canceled plans to build a 500-room resort hotel at National Harbor.

In 2011, the company announced that it would no longer allow secondary market DVC points purchasers to use their points on Disney Cruise Line, Adventures by Disney or the Concierge Collection luxury hotel group. In April 2016, Disney Vacation Development also ended the extension of Membership Extras benefits to those who purchase DVC contracts through secondary markets. Disney was one of the last major timeshare companies to eliminate these benefits according to the American Resort Development Association. In 2019, DVC announced further restrictions on resale purchases.  On resale purchases made after January 18, 2019, DVC resale contracts purchased for the original 14 resorts at Walt Disney World, Disneyland, and 3 stand-alone locations will only be able to use their points at those 14 existing resorts and not at the upcoming Riviera and Reflections resorts. Additionally, resale buyers at Riviera will only be allowed to use their points at the Riviera resort.

Starting in mid-2015, DVC began using a nonjudicial foreclosure process forcing auction bidders to be present instead of allowing online bid submissions with the Orange County Clerk of Court's office. In May 2016 DVC approved Vacatia for DVC resales.  This would be in addition to such sales through Fidelity Resales. In May 2016, DVC announced that its new property at Disney's Wilderness Lodge would be called Copper Creek Villas & Cabins.

A brisk aftermarket with a perceived high resale value exists for the Disney timeshare memberships. In May 2016, Sharket time-share market research company issued a 2015 resale value list (having a score based on resale volume and prices) which saw memberships in Disney Vacation Club locations crowded out the competitors. Saratoga Springs, Bay Lake Tower at the Contemporary and Animal Kingdom Villas were the company's timeshares near the top of the list.

In November 2019, plans for a 12-story club tower attached to the Disneyland Hotel were filed. There was no timeline given.

DVC plans to open an expansion to the villas at Disney's Grand Floridian in 2022. In 2022, they also announced plans to construct a new tower as an expansion to the DVC property at Disney's Polynesian Village Resort - this is planned to open in 2024.

Membership
To be a DVC member, one must purchase a one-time real estate interest in one of the Disney Vacation Club Resorts, and thereafter pay annual dues. All memberships are sold as either a ground lease or a term-for-years. Their timeshare may not be sold in Nebraska. Disney includes a right of first refusal clause in their membership contracts and uses a nonjudicial foreclosure process. The company has only two approved resale companies, Fidelity Resales and Vacatia. Disney also provides time-share loans for the purchaser.

Locations

Additionally, non-Disney hotels are available via exchange through Interval International

See also

Time-share

References

External links

 
Walt Disney Parks and Resorts
Hospitality companies established in 1991
Timeshare chains
Year of establishment missing
1991 establishments in Florida